Habib Iddrisu is a Ghanaian politician who is a member of the New Patriotic Party (NPP). He is the member of parliament elect for the Tolon Constituency in the Northern Region of Ghana.

Career 
Iddrisu is currently serving as the Deputy Executive Secretary of Ghana Free Zones Authority in charge of Tema enclave.

Politics 
In the 2016 parliamentary elections, Iddrisu stood for the Sagnarigu Constituency against the member of parliament Alhassan Bashir Fuseini of the NDC and lost with 7,888 votes representing 20.7% against Fuseini's 26,898 votes representing 70.7%.

Ahead of the 2020 elections, Iddrisu entered the race for the parliamentary candidate in the NPP primaries, this time around in the Tolon Constituency. In June 2020 he won the primaries for the Tolon Constituency after defeating incumbent member of parliament Wahab Wumbei Suhuyini who had served as member of parliament for two terms and been in parliament since January 2013. He won by getting 338 votes whilst the incumbent had 164 votes and the rest of the three candidates had a total of 32 votes.

Iddrisu was elected member of parliament for Tolon in the 2020 December parliamentary elections. He was declared winner in the parliamentary elections after obtaining 31,429 votes representing 58.37% against his closest contender Yussif Adam of the National Democratic Congress who had 22,145 votess representing 41.13%.

References 

Living people
Ghanaian Muslims
New Patriotic Party politicians
People from Northern Region (Ghana)
Ghanaian MPs 2021–2025
Year of birth missing (living people)